was a daimyō during mid-Edo period Japan.

Biography
Matsudaira Sukemasa was the third son of Matsudaira Sukekuni, the daimyō of Yoshida Domain in Mikawa Province. On the death of his father in 1752, he became daimyō of Hamamatsu Domain and head of the Okōchi-branch of the Matsudaira clan at the age of eight.

On December 27, 1758, he was transferred to Miyazu Domain in Tango Province, but owing to his poor health, was unable to exercise administration. On November 27, 1761, he retired from public life, turning the domain over to his adopted son Matsudaira Suketada.

Sukemasa died two months later at the age of 17.

References 
 Papinot, Edmond. (1906) Dictionnaire d'histoire et de géographie du japon. Tokyo: Librarie Sansaisha...Click link for digitized 1906 Nobiliaire du japon (2003)
 The content of much of this article was derived from that of the corresponding article on Japanese Wikipedia.

|-

|-

Fudai daimyo
Tokugawa clan
1744 births
1762 deaths